This is a list of electoral results for the Electoral district of Pakenham in Victorian state elections.

Members for Pakenham

Election results

Elections in the 2020s

Elections in the 1990s

References

Victoria (Australia) state electoral results by district